Horvatovi is a Croatian telenovela produced by RTL Televizija. It is an original story, produced in 2015, and starring Bojana Gregorić Goran Navojec Bojan Navojec Ljubomir Kerekeš. Broadcast started in September 2015. Horvatovi is an adaptation of Los Serrano.

Cast

References

External links

Croatian television series
2010s Croatian television series
Telenovelas
2015 Croatian television series debuts
Television series about families
Fictional Croatian people
RTL (Croatian TV channel) original programming